Michel Wlassikoff  is an historian of graphic design and typography, graduate in "Histoire de l'École des hautes études en sciences sociales" (Ehess)

Biography 
He directed the magazine Signes, from 1991 to 1998. He has also given many contributions to major graphic magazines in France (Etapes) and also in Europe and the rest of the world. He is also involved in the "Revues parlées" about Graphics at the Centre Georges-Pompidou.

He is a founder of the signs associated with Bernard Baissait and others.

He is responsible for the www.signes.org site dedicated to the history of graphic design and typography.

Works 
He has written books on graphic design including:

 Signes de la collaboration et de la résistance
 Histoire du graphisme en France
 Futura : Une gloire typographique co-written with Alexandre Dumas de Rauly,
 Mai 68 : L'affiche en héritage avec Marc Riboud.

References 

Living people
Year of birth missing (living people)
Graphic design
20th-century French historians
Curators from Paris
21st-century French historians